A blind arcade or blank arcade is an arcade (a series of arches) that has no actual openings and that is applied to the surface of a wall as a decorative element: i.e., the arches are not windows or openings but are part of the masonry face. It is designed as an ornamental architectural element and has no load-bearing function.

Similar structures 

Whereas a blind arch is usually a single arch or a series of joined arches as a frieze (sometimes called Lombard band), a blind arcade is composed of a series of arches that have well-defined columns in between its arches.

A blind arcade may resemble several s (false/blank windows or sealed-up windows) or blind niches that are side by side.

Examples 

Blind arcades are a common decorative features on the facades of Romanesque and Gothic buildings throughout Western Europe, and are also a common feature in Byzantine Orthodox churches in Eastern Europe, and in Armenian churches.

See also 
 Dwarf gallery
 Flying butress

References

External links
 Dictionary of French Architecture from the 11th to 16th century/Volume 1/Blind Arcade
 The Monasery of Marmashen

Arcades (architecture)